Cierra Dillard (born May 8, 1996) is an American professional basketball player who plays for Alexandria Sporting Club. She attended Gates Chili High School in Rochester, New York. She later attended the University of Massachusetts Amherst for two years, before transferring to the University at Buffalo. At both universities, she played on the school's respective women's basketball teams. While playing at Buffalo, Dillard helped the Bulls to back-to-back NCAA Division I women's basketball tournament appearances in 2018 and 2019, including a Sweet Sixteen appearance in 2018.

In 2022, Dillard guided Alexandria Sporting Club to the 2022 FIBA Africa Women's Champions Cup title, scoring a team-high 21 points in the finals.

Umass and Buffalo statistics 

Source

Professional career
Dillard was selected by the Minnesota Lynx in the second round of the 2019 WNBA draft. The Lynx waived her in May but shortly later she was claimed of waivers by the Los Angeles Sparks. After appearing in one preseason game for the Sparks, she was once again waived on May 18.

References

External links
 
Buffalo Bulls bio

1996 births
Living people
American women's basketball players
Basketball players from New York (state)
Buffalo Bulls women's basketball players
Guards (basketball)
Minnesota Lynx draft picks
Sportspeople from Rochester, New York
UMass Minutewomen basketball players